Naaman I. Roosevelt (born December 24, 1987) is a former football wide receiver and currently an Offensive Assistant for the  Saskatchewan Roughriders. He played college football at University at Buffalo. He has been a member of the Buffalo Bills, Cleveland Browns, Detroit Lions, Saskatchewan Roughriders, Montreal Alouettes and Winnipeg Blue Bombers.

Early life and amateur career 
Roosevelt was raised in the East Side of Buffalo in an area which he described as violent. In that environment, he later said, it was difficult to think past the next day and his peers "didn't think about going to college and things like that." Roosevelt said that outlook changed when he was recruited to attend St. Joseph's Collegiate Institute, a private school in suburban Tonawanda.

At St. Joseph's, Roosevelt played basketball and football as a quarterback and kick returner. As a senior in 2005, he threw a Western New York record 35 touchdown passes and was named the Buffalo News' Player of the Year. The University at Buffalo was the only school to offer Roosevelt a scholarship to play offense; New Hampshire offered him a scholarship to play cornerback. Roosevelt was the first player successfully recruited by new head coach Turner Gill. Roosevelt accepted the offer on the condition that he be allowed to compete for the starting quarterback role.

Roosevelt lost the quarterback job to returning sophomore starter Drew Willy. Roosevelt was converted to wide receiver as a freshman and started seven games, catching 31 passes and 2 touchdowns. In his second year, the wide receiver caught 63 passes and 4 touchdowns. In his junior season, Roosevelt dramatically increased his production, catching 104 passes, primarily from Willy.

On September 13, 2008, Roosevelt caught a Hail Mary pass from quarterback Drew Willy as time expired to beat the Temple Owls at UB Stadium. Also in his junior season, Buffalo won the 2008 MAC Championship Game against Nate Davis and the Ball State Cardinals. Roosevelt's 104 receptions was one short of the MAC Conference record at the time. His 13 touchdowns in 2008 set a school record.

In 2009, he caught 70 passes for 9 touchdowns. On September 19, 2009, he threw a 34-yard touchdown pass to tight end Jesse Rack against Central Florida. Although a star quarterback in high school, it was the only touchdown pass of his college career.

, Roosevelt still held school records for career receiving yards, career receptions, single-season receiving yards and single-season receptions. In February 2023, he was inducted into UB's athletics hall of fame.

College statistics

Professional career

Buffalo Bills 
Roosevelt went undrafted in the 2010 NFL Draft. He was signed as an undrafted free agent by the Buffalo Bills on April 24. Roosevelt was cut by the Bills on final cuts on September 4, 2010, but signed to their practice squad on September 5, 2010. On November 27, 2010, Roosevelt was promoted to the active roster after coach Chan Gailey said he did an "excellent job" on the practice squad. He made his NFL debut the following day in a loss to the Pittsburgh Steelers. The following week, he recorded the only tackle of his NFL career, bringing down Greg Camarillo after a 17-yard punt return. On December 19, 2010, he was targeted with and caught the first passes of his NFL career, reeling in two of three throws from Ryan Fitzpatrick for 35 yards. He ended the season with a total of nine receptions for a total of 139 yards, one carry for three yards and two kick returns for 31 yards.

Before the start of the 2011 season, Roosevelt was again cut from the active roster and re-signed to the practice squad. Bills General Manager Buddy Nix said of the move "This year, we cut guys that were good players. We cut Naaman Roosevelt. We like Naaman. It got down to a numbers situation. We had six receivers, we normally have five." He appeared in his first game in the third week of the 2011 season. He caught at least one pass in each game between the fourth and tenth weeks of the season. On October 16, 2011, Roosevelt caught his first pro touchdown pass, a 60-yard catch-and-run at MetLife Stadium against the New York Giants. On August 31, 2012, he was cut by the Bills.

Cleveland Browns 
On July 23, 2013, he was signed by the Cleveland Browns.

Detroit Lions 
After the 2013 season, he was not re-signed and was signed after a tryout for the Detroit Lions on April 23, 2014.

Buffalo Bills 
After being let go by the Lions, Roosevelt resigned with the Buffalo Bills on July 21, 2014. The Bills released Roosevelt on August 29, 2014. On October 3, 2014 the Bills re-signed Roosevelt to the practice squad. He was released from the practice squad on October 4, 2014.

Saskatchewan Roughriders 
Roosevelt signed with the Saskatchewan Roughriders of the Canadian Football League on March 14, 2015. Roosevelt had a breakout year for the Roughriders in his second season in the CFL. He played in the first 11 games of the season before being placed on the six-game injured list. Following the season he was named the Riders Most Outstanding Player despite missing 7 games. Additionally, he accepted a two-year contract extension from the Riders. Roosevelt finished the 2016 season with 1,095 receiving yards, the ninth-highest total in the league. In Week 14 of the 2017 season Roosevelt took a helmet-to-helmet hit from Calgary's Tunde Adeleke and was placed on the team's six-game injured list. At the time of the injury Roosevelt was the Riders leading receiver, and had the fifth most receiving yards in the league with 923. Roosevelt was named a divisional All-Star for 2017 after another 1,000 yard season and 8 touchdown catches, but had a down year in 2018 with injuries to both himself, as well as several injuries to new starting quarterback Zach Collaros. The Roughriders offense had already taken hits prior to and during the regular season with the release of experienced pass catchers such as Rob Bagg, Chad Owens, Bakari Grant, and Duron Carter. Several days into free agency for 2019, Roosevelt turned down an offer from rival Winnipeg to sign a one year extension with the Roughriders for roughly $160,000 Canadian Dollars, as well as performance incentives to increase earnings. Roosevelt rewarded the Riders with a bounce-back year; he played his first season of all 18 games, and despite only one touchdown catch, he caught 77 passes for 946 yards, with which Roosevelt surpassed the 4,000 yard mark for his career, as well as making his 300th catch. Following the season he was not re-signed by the Riders and became a free agent on February 11, 2020.

Montreal Alouettes 
On February 22, 2020, Roosevelt signed with the Montreal Alouettes. He signed a contract extension with the team on December 18, 2020. He was released on July 26, 2021.

Winnipeg Blue Bombers 
On August 30, 2021, Roosevelt signed with the Winnipeg Blue Bombers. He was released by the Bombers' practice roster on November 19, 2021 without having appeared in a game for the team.

Statistics

Coaching career
Roosevelt served as a "guest coach" at the Saskatchewan Roughriders training camp in 2022 and was hired as an offensive assistant coach prior to the 2023 season.

Personal life
Roosevelt returned to UB and finished his bachelor's degree in sociology in 2022. He said he completed his degree as part of a larger goal of becoming a college football coach.

References

External links 

NFL profile
CFL profile
Buffalo Bills bio
Browns sign Naaman Roosevelt
Detroit Lions bio
Winnipeg Blue Bombers bio

1987 births
Living people
Sportspeople from Buffalo, New York
Players of American football from Buffalo, New York
American football wide receivers
Canadian football wide receivers
African-American players of American football
African-American players of Canadian football
Buffalo Bulls football players
Buffalo Bills players
Cleveland Browns players
Detroit Lions players
Saskatchewan Roughriders players
St. Joseph's Collegiate Institute alumni
Montreal Alouettes players
Winnipeg Blue Bombers players
21st-century African-American sportspeople
20th-century African-American people